Paulo Galvão (born 1967 in Portimão, Algarve, Portugal) is a composer, lutenist, theorbist and guitarist. According to Dan Hill, Galvão has published "musical forgeries" for baroque guitar under the name "Antonio da Costa". Galvão's works have been performed by Marcello Vitale and Marco Meloni.

Biography
Paulo Galvão had his first musical studies at the Escola de Música de Grupo Coral de Lagos. He later studied classical guitar, lute, theorbo, and baroque guitar with Manuel Morais at the National Conservatory in Lisbon. He had further professional studies with Ede Roth, Hopkinson Smith, Jakob Lindberg and Carlo Marchione.

Discography
O Cancioneiro de Elvas. Vitor Lima, sång, Joaquin Galvão, blockflöjt, Paulo Galvão, luta. Musicália M.01.01.004
Duo Galvão. Recital. Vivaldi, Ortiz, Molino, Rodil, Galvão. Joaquin Galvão, flöjter, Paulo Galvão, gitarr, vihuela, luta, teorb. Musicália M.01.01.001
O Livro de Guitarra do Conde de Redondo - Guitar Book of the Count Redondo, Label: Musicalia ASIN: B00005425I
Duo Galvão - Música Portuguesa para Flauta e Violão

References

Paulo Galvao's works for baroque guitar

1967 births
People from Portimão
21st-century classical composers
Composers for lute
Living people
Theorbists
Male guitarists
Pseudepigraphy
Portuguese classical composers
Portuguese classical guitarists
Historicist composers
Musical hoaxes
Portuguese lutenists
Portuguese male classical composers
21st-century guitarists
21st-century male musicians